Putting It Together: Direct from Broadway is a 2001 film of the Broadway production of the musical revue Putting It Together as captured live in performance on Broadway featuring the show's original Broadway cast. The show was captured at Broadway's Ethel Barrymore Theatre in New York City February 20, 2000, utilizing multiple high-definition cameras by Broadway Worldwide.

The film was released October 14, 2001, on cable and satellite pay-per-view channels in the U.S., Canada, and Latin America. The program was released on DVD and VHS February 26, 2002, by Good Times Video, with a DVD re-release December 12, 2006, by Image Entertainment. HBO bought the program in December 2002 for a two-year contract on the network.

Cast
 Carol Burnett as The Wife
 George Hearn as The Husband
 Ruthie Henshall as The Young Woman
 John Barrowman as The Young Man
 Bronson Pinchot as The Narrator

Musical numbers
For a complete list of the songs performed and the shows in which they appeared, go to https://www.imdb.com/title/tt0260305/soundtrack?ref_=tt_trv_snd

References

External links

Direct from Broadway site

2001 films
American musical films
Films about music and musicians
Filmed stage productions
2000s musical films
Television shows directed by Don Roy King
2000s English-language films
2000s American films